Come Hell or High Water is the second studio album from the experimental rock group The Flowers of Hell. Released in April 2009, the album was recorded in over 40 sessions with 30 musicians in London, Prague, Toronto, Detroit, and Texas. According to an interview in Now magazine and a review in URB, the album was conceived of as a celebration of synaesthesia, and composer Greg Jarvis based the composing, recording, arranging, and preliminary mixing on his synaesthetic visions.

Noted guests on the record include Patti Smith/Iggy Pop collaborator Ivan Kral on bass who had been a mentor to Jarvis, mix work from Spacemen 3's Peter Kember, strings from British Sea Power's Abi Fry and The Clientele's Mel Draisey and Broken Social Scene's Julie Penner, amongst others.

The LP sleeve is one of six displayed at the Tate Britain and Paris's Musee d'Orsay in their major 2020 Aubrey Beardsley retrospective. Beardsley's work was adapted for the cover by Greg Jarvis and features in the exhibition catalogue as well as in the exhibition itself.

Track listing 

 "Opus 66 (Part 1)" – 4:12
 "Blumchen" – 6:17
 "Forest Of Noise" – 3:44
 "The Strength Of String" – 4:00
 "White Out" – 3:22
 "Darklands" – 5:08
 "Pipe Dreams" – 5:25
 "The Invocation" – 3:33
 "Past Tense" – 4:41
 "Occasional Tears" – 4:03

Personnel 
Acoustic Guitar - Steve Head
Baritone Sax - Tom Hodges
Bass - Ivan Kral, Will Carruthers, Greg Jarvis, Barry Newman, Ronnie Morris
Bass Harmonica - Tom Hodges
Cello - Amy Laing
Clarinet - Miss Hypnotique
Drums & Percussion - Jon McCann, Guri Hummelsund, Linda Noelle Bush, Dave Gee 
Ebow & Feedback Manipulation - Jeremiah Knight
Flute - Brian Taylor, Tom Hodges
Electric Guitar - Greg Jarvis
Harmonica - Barry Newman, Greg Jarvis
Keys & Programming - Jan P. Muchow, John Mark Lapham, Greg Jarvis
Musical Saw - Tom Hodges
Piano - Greg Jarvis, Jan P. Muchow
Soprano Sax - Ray Dickaty
Swerpeti - Greg Jarvis
Tenor Sax - Ray Dickaty
Trombone - Owen James
Trumpet - Owen James, Ian Thorn, Tom Knott
Viola - Abi Fry
Violin - Mel Draisey, Julie Penner
Voice - Anna Nicole Ziesche, Guri Hummelsund, Inayat Khan

References 

http://drownedinsound.com/releases/17619/reviews/4146360 
The Independent
http://www.theskinny.co.uk/music/records/45267-the_flowers_hell_come_hell_high_water

2009 albums
The Flowers of Hell albums